The IMF, or International Monetary Fund is an international organization.

IMF may also refer to:

Entertainment
 Impossible Missions Force, a fictional secret espionage agency in the Mission: Impossible television and film series
 International Music Feed, a music video television network
 Internationale Medien und Film, see Intermedia (company)

Science and technology
 Immunofluorescence Labeling, a method used in immunology and cytology
 Individual Master File, the system used by the IRS to process tax transactions
 Inframammary fold, in anatomy
 Intern in Marriage and Family Therapy
 Initial mass function, in stellar astronomy
 Intelligent Message Filter, a Microsoft anti-spam technology for Exchange/Outlook
 Intermolecular forces, non-bonding electrostatic forces between molecules
 Interoperable Master Format, a file-based format standardized by SMPTE for finished audio-visual masters, including movies, episodic content, advertisements, and shorts
 Interplanetary magnetic field, in space
 Intramuscular fat, in anatomy

Other uses
 International Myeloma Foundation, a non-profit serving patients with a cancer of plasma cells in the bone marrow
 International Metalworkers' Federation, a global union federation
 Internationale Maifestspiele Wiesbaden, International May Festival
 Fédération Internationale de Motocyclisme, aka International Motorcycling Federation